Valentino Orsolini Cencelli (7 February 1898 – 22 May 1971) was an Italian agronomist and politician, who served as Deputy (1924–1939), member of the Chamber of Fasces and Corporations (1939–1943), and the first Podestà of Littoria (1932–1933).

He was one of the protagonists of the land reclamation of the Pontine Marshes.

References

1898 births
1971 deaths
Deputies of Legislature XXVII of the Kingdom of Italy
Deputies of Legislature XXVIII of the Kingdom of Italy
Deputies of Legislature XXIX of the Kingdom of Italy
Members of the Chamber of Fasces and Corporations
Mayors of Latina, Lazio
National Fascist Party politicians